Adele Walker (born 10 August 1976) (née Turner) is a  British former biathlete.

See also
Biathlon World Cup
Biathlon World Championships
List of Olympic medalists in biathlon
Paralympic biathlon

References

1976 births
Living people
Sportspeople from Whitehaven
English female biathletes